Michael Thomas Shawaryn (born September 17, 1994) is an American professional baseball pitcher for the Lake Country DockHounds of the American Association of Professional Baseball. He previously played in Major League Baseball (MLB) for the Boston Red Sox.

Amateur career
Shawaryn grew up in Carneys Point, New Jersey, and graduated from Gloucester Catholic High School in 2013, where he pitched for the school's baseball team, and helped lead them to four state championships. Shawaryn also helped lead his Brooklawn Legion Baseball team to a 2013 American Legion World Series title. Shawaryn was recruited by Duke, Maryland, LSU, Stony Brook and Vanderbilt. Shawaryn was also recruited by Monmouth, whose pitching coach soon left for Maryland. Shawaryn chose to play college baseball at Maryland, persuaded by the pitching coach who went to his games on the Terrapins' off days.
He became known as the “unicorn” in Maryland after not making a commitment until February. Shawaryn was previously drafted by the Kansas City Royals in the 32nd round of the 2013 MLB draft, but did not sign because of his commitment to Maryland. He pursued a degree in business. In 2015, he played collegiate summer baseball in the Cape Cod Baseball League for the Yarmouth-Dennis Red Sox. Coming into the 2016 college season, Shawaryn was named a first team All-American. He set multiple program records during his three seasons at Maryland, including career wins (30), career strikeouts (307), and single-season wins (13, in 2015).

Professional career

Boston Red Sox
Shawaryn was drafted by the Boston Red Sox in the fifth round of the 2016 MLB draft, and signed with them. He joined the Class A Short Season Lowell Spinners, where he posted a 2.87 ERA in  innings pitched. In 2017, he split time between the Class A Greenville Drive and the Class A-Advanced Salem Red Sox where he went a combined 8–7 with a 3.81 ERA between both clubs. Shawaryn started the 2018 season with the Double-A Portland Sea Dogs. In 19 appearances (all starts), he compiled a 6–8 record with a 3.28 ERA, 99 strikeouts, and 27 walks in  innings pitched. Shawaryn was promoted to the Triple-A Pawtucket Red Sox on August 3, appearing in seven games (six starts) with a 3.93 ERA and 3–2 record.

Shawaryn started the 2019 season with Pawtucket. On May 30, he was added to Boston's active MLB roster, as Héctor Velázquez was placed on the injured list. Shawaryn made his MLB debut on June 7 against the Tampa Bay Rays, pitching two innings in relief and striking out four while giving up one run on a home run by Kevin Kiermaier. Shawaryn was optioned back to Pawtucket on July 1, having appeared eight games (all in relief) with an 8.53 ERA while striking out 20 in  innings. He was recalled to Boston on September 4, following the end of the Triple-A season. Overall with the 2019 Red Sox, Shawaryn appeared in 14 games, recording a 9.74 ERA and 29 strikeouts in  innings.

Shawaryn was optioned to Triple-A Pawtucket on March 8, 2020. On August 19, he was designated for assignment. The club assigned him outright to Pawtucket on August 26. The Red Sox released Shawaryn on April 25, 2021.

Kansas City Royals
On April 27, 2021, Shawaryn signed a minor league contract with the Kansas City Royals organization. Shawaryn recorded a 4.63 ERA in 9 appearances with the Triple-A Omaha Storm Chasers before being released on June 14.

Lake Country DockHounds
On March 14, 2023, Shawaryn signed with the Lake Country DockHounds of the American Association of Professional Baseball.

References

Further reading

External links

1994 births
Living people
People from Carneys Point Township, New Jersey
Sportspeople from Salem County, New Jersey
Baseball players from New Jersey
Gloucester Catholic High School alumni
Major League Baseball pitchers
Boston Red Sox players
Maryland Terrapins baseball players
Yarmouth–Dennis Red Sox players
Lowell Spinners players
Greenville Drive players
Salem Red Sox players
Portland Sea Dogs players
Pawtucket Red Sox players
Mesa Solar Sox players
Omaha Storm Chasers players